A list of notable characters from the NBC soap opera Days of Our Lives that significantly impacted storylines and debuted between January 1, 1980, and the end of 1989, in order of first appearance.

DJ Craig

Donald Craig Jr., known as "DJ" and "Donnie", is the firstborn child of Marlena Evans, whom she has with her first onscreen husband, Don Craig. Marlena and Don meet and fall in love in 1976, and they marry on March 5, 1979. DJ's birth is portrayed onscreen in the episode of February 26, 1980, Donnie is premature, and dies three months later from Sudden Infant Death Syndrome. The couple separate when they cannot come to terms with their baby's death.

Journalist Dorathy Gass called the storyline "shocking". She noted the value of soaps relaying issues and situations that occur in real-life and helping spreading awareness to audiences, but also said the storyline "may have been far too sensitive to bring up in the first place – leaving many fans devastated and heartbroken over the baby and entire situation".

Jessica Blake Fallon

Jessica Blake Fallon was portrayed by Jean Bruce Scott from April 30, 1980. Scott departed from the series on November 9, 1982. In August 2012, it was announced that Scott would return to the show after nearly a thirty-year absence, airing on August 31 until September 6, 2012.

The character of Jessica is the daughter of Marie Horton and Alex Marshall, granddaughter of Tom and Alice Horton and mother of recent character, Nick Fallon. As a result of abuse at the hands of her adoptive parents Jessica suffers from dissociative identity disorder; one of her alters, Angelique, terrorized her mother while the other one, Angel, became involved with Jake Kositchek, who would later be known as the Salem Strangler, a serial killer. Angel and Jake ran off to Las Vegas to elope, but Jessica came to and called Alex. Marie and Alex rushed to Vegas and stopped the wedding just in the nick of time. Jessica fell apart and was hospitalized.

In 1982, after recovering from her mental health problems, Jessica broke off her relationship with Jake and became engaged to Joshua Fallon. Joshua and Jessica married and eventually left Salem. Offscreen, they had a son named Nick who came to Salem without his parents in 2006.

In 2012, Jessica came to Salem to see Nick, who was in prison for murder and was getting paroled. Nick was put on probation and chose to serve out his probation in Salem, so Jessica left Salem alone. In 2014, Jessica received horrible news that Nick had been murdered, and Julie Olson Williams delivered Nick's body to her and Joshua, so they could bury him. Nick's murderer, Gabi Hernandez, accepted a plea deal and Jessica agreed to it, not wanting the heartache of a trial.

Jake Kositchek

Jake Kositchek was played by Jack Coleman from June 10, 1981, until June 1, 1982, when the character was written out of the show. After Days, Coleman would later be known as the second actor to play Steven Carrington in the ABC prime time soap opera Dynasty and as Noah Bennet in the NBC science-fiction drama series Heroes and its spin-off Heroes Reborn.

Jake was the younger brother of Chris Kositchek (Josh Taylor), shortly after coming to town he fell in love with Angel, the alternate personality of Jessica Blake Fallon (Jean Bruce Scott). Jake was also briefly involved with Jessica's cousin, Hope Williams (Tammy Taylor). When Jake and "Angel" got engaged and planned to elope in Las Vegas, Jessica's parents Marie Horton (Lanna Saunders) and Alex Marshall (Quinn Redeker) learned of the elopement after Hope discovered Jessica's illness. Marie and Alex arrived in the nick of time to see Jessica reemerge and the wedding be interrupted. Jake was heartbroken after being rejected by Jessica who was going through psychiatric treatment under Marlena Evans (Deidre Hall). Jessica's rejection became the catalyst for Jake's mental breakdown, leading him to become the Salem Strangler, a serial killer who strangled many women to death including Mary Anderson (Melinda O. Fee) and Marlena's twin Samantha Evans (Andrea Hall), who was killed in a case of mistaken identity.

The Salem Strangler storyline was the very first serial killer storyline in the soap's history, and the supposed murder of Marlena at the hands of the killer resulted in one of the first fan campaigns ever.

Eugene Bradford

Eugene Bradford was played by John de Lancie from 1982 to 1986 and again in 1989 to 1990. Also known as Gene and Euge, he went by the pseudonym Bettina Lovecraft while working as a Salem Today columnist.

Eugene was a distant relative of the DiMera family through a prior marriage, and referred to Tony DiMera as a cousin. Prior to marrying Calliope Jones on December 31, 1985, Eugene had been married four other times. Eugene's first two wives were murdered, while his third marriage to Marlena Evans was actually a cover-up (Eugene pretended to be married to Marlena when she was pregnant with Roman Brady's twins; at this time Roman was believed to be dead) and not legal. He later served as the namesake for Roman and Marlena's daughter Samantha Gene (Sami Brady).

Throughout the show, Eugene was portrayed as having psychic premonitions, and on a number of occasions they were useful in helping Salem Police and the ISA. In the last episode in which he appeared, he created a time machine type device and used the device. Upon activation, there was a big explosion and Eugene disappeared. He has not been seen on Days since. In 2006, Calliope returned as the fashion designer hired to make Mimi Lockhart's wedding dress, and she stated that she and Eugene remain happily married.

Daphne DiMera

Daphne DiMera is a fictional character on the NBC soap opera Days of Our Lives. She was played by Madlyn Rhue from 1982 to 1984.

Daphne was the common law wife of Stefano DiMera, who fled from him while pregnant with her son, Antony. She raised Tony in Australia.

When Daphne learned that Tony was in love with Renée DuMonde, whom he believed to be his half-sister, she told him that he was not Stefano's son after all, but belonged to a man named Enrico. This led to a brief romantic reunion between Tony and Renée, but Renée was soon murdered. Years later, it would be discovered that Tony was actually Stefano's biological son (it was never revealed if Daphne believed he was Enrico's or if she lied). After numerous retcons (which included revealing John Black was Tony's half-brother via Daphne and that Tony had been replaced by his surgically altered identical cousin Andre for almost two decades), it was revealed that John was not Daphne's son after all but rather the son of Stefano's father Santo DiMera and Colleen Brady, the sister of Shawn Brady. The real Tony has since commented that Enrico the gardener is his actual father.

Daphne died in 1984 when a plane carrying a number of Salemites crashed in Haiti.

Daphne's real surname is unknown. She was always referred to as a DiMera, because her marriage was a common law marriage to Stefano. She is the aunt of Lawrence Alamain via her sister, Philomena.

Ilya Petrov

Ilya Petrov was portrayed by Kai Wulff from 1983 to 1986 and for a few episodes in 1991. With the exception of Bart and Rolf, Petrov is the most well known henchman of Stefano. In comparison to Bart, he mostly succeeded and completed his assignments. Petrov assisted Stefano in a few of his many schemes. When Stefano kidnapped Marlena Evans & Liz Chandler in early 1983, Petrov was the one who kept an eye of them so they wouldn't escape. He then had small assignments in Stefano's devilish Salem Slasher plot. When Stefano had to escape after some failures of both himself and André DiMera, Petrov was already in the car. But Roman and Abe were ready as well and chased them. After struggling to shake off the police, and a drunk Alex Marshall caused some problem, the car drove off a bridge and fell down into a river. Alex was found but neither Petrov or Stefano.

A few months later, Stefano was seen very much alive looking for the three prisms, and soon Petrov was seen taking orders from Stefano. He kidnapped Hope Williams for Stefano in an attempt to faster lure Roman into Stefano's trap. He also got instructions from Stefano on how to activate the volcano. After locking up a noisy Shane Donovan, he fulfilled his orders and activated the volcano successfully.

In late 1985-early 1986, Petrov was seen in Miami, representing Stefano in a three-way wager with Victor Kiriakis and corrupt ISA chief George Nickerson, with the stakes being "the Purse (provided by Victor, which turned out to be clues to the locations of (1) a set of stolen U.S. Treasury engravings which were hidden in 1979 in Stockholm, and (2) a priceless Mayan treasure that could only be located during a specific astronomical event in 1991), The Power (provided by the ISA, a codebook with information that ostensibly gave the holder total immunity from every intelligence and law enforcement network in the world), and the Pawn (a "most formidable and dangerous man" controlled by Stefano, at the time believed to be the missing-and-presumed-dead Roman Brady, but later retconned into the separate character of John Black)."

In 2015, John Black embarked on an ISA-assisted quest to unravel the mysteries of his heretofore unknown past, including his parentage, once and for all. This coincided with the show's 50th anniversary. An important scene showed John viewing an ISA computer file on Petrov, which expanded his story to reveal that he was a Cold War-era Soviet agent who defected to the West, and became at one point a teacher at a private school in Vermont called Winterthorne around the time he became one of Stefano's henchmen. Winterthorne was later revealed to be a "front" for a secret training facility for assassins, run by a Far Eastern organization called the Phantom Alliance, which turned out to have been founded in the 1950s by John's real father, Timothy Robecheaux aka "Yo Ling". Petrov was revealed to have been Yo Ling's accomplice, and temporarily "defected" to Stefano's organization. In this storyline, it was suggested that Petrov eventually returned to the Phantom Alliance's fold.

Trista Evans Bradford

Trista Evans Bradford was played by Barbara Crampton from March 4, 1983. Crampton only lasted in the role for seven months; she departed from the series on October 24, 1983, when the character was killed off during the Salem Slasher storyline. Crampton later returned as Trista in flashbacks from February 14 to March 9, 1984.

Pete Jannings

Pete Jannings is a fictional character on the NBC daytime television soap opera Days of Our Lives. The character was played by Michael Leon from July 5, 1983, to December 23, 1986.

Pete was a Vipers gang member who came to Salem and was connected to the attempted rapes of Gwen Davies and Sandy Horton. Later that same night after Melissa Horton (Lisa Trusel) caught Pete stealing food from Shenanigans, he kidnapped her with the intent to leave Salem, but a snow storm stranded them at the old Horton farm. Pete confided many things to Melissa and she sympathized with her kidnapper. When the police arrived, Pete was arrested. Melissa did not press charges and Pete was soon released. Eventually, Pete and Melissa started secretly dating, During a gang rumble, Pete accidentally shot Melissa's adoptive father, Mickey Horton, (John Clarke) causing Pete to run from the law and abruptly flee Salem. Pete found Melissa at a summer camp outside of Salem and they began dating again. They returned to Salem and their relationship became public knowledge, Eventually, On February 14, Valentine's Day, in a double ceremony with Melissa's adoptive patents, Mickey and Maggie Horton (John Clarke and Suzanne Rogers), Pete and Melissa were married. Unfortunately, Melissa's affair with Lars Englund brought an end to their marriage and Pete left Salem,

Larry Welch

Larry Welch, played by Andrew Hyatt Masset from July 11 to October 21, 1983, on a recurring status and November 1, 1983, to December 9, 1985, and again from October 15, 2002, to March 11, 2003, on contract status, then back to recurring from June 10 to July 23, 2003, and finally a guest appearance on June 8, 2016, as well as a guest appearance in the second season of Days of Our Lives: Beyond Salem on July 13, 2022. 

Larry Welch was a constant obstacle in Bo and Hope's supercouple love story. Larry blackmailed Hope into marrying him but on the day of the wedding Bo rode in on his motorcycle and kidnapped Hope from the wedding. In 1985, Larry killed Stefano's daughter, Megan, and dumped her body in a hot tub; Hope was the prime suspect. Victor Kiriakis learned the truth and forced Larry to take the fall for the crime syndicate that he was running.

Larry returned in 2002 when he again kidnapped Hope in an attempt to get his revenge on her, Bo and Victor. He was presumed dead after a prison break, but in reality, was helping Nicole in her plans to murder Victor. Larry was hit and killed by a car in early 2003.

He returns in Days of Our Lives: Beyond Salem as a judge. When Bo wants permission to go to Earth to save Hope, the decision is up to him whether or not permission is granted.

Tess Jannings

Tess Jannings is a fictional character on the NBC daytime soap opera Days of Our Lives, The character was played by Melonie Mazman from February 1, 1984, to November 20, 1984.

Megan Hathaway

Megan Hathaway is a fictional character from the soap opera, Days of Our Lives. She is played by Cheryl-Ann Wilson (now known as Miranda Wilson) from 1984-1985, and 2023-present. Wilson also played the role in 2022 in Days of Our Lives: Beyond Salem.

Megan comes to Salem in 1984 with her adopted father Maxwell Hathaway, though she is secretly the daughter of Stefano DiMera. Megan had been the high school love of Bo Brady who so deeply broke his heart that he was unable to allow himself to fully commit to Hope Brady. Megan thought Bo had left her, never answered her letters and broke her heart, as completely as he thought she had broken his. Bo thought Megan no longer loved him because she never answered any letter or spoke to her when he called. When they discover it was her mother who interfered to keep them apart, she became obsessed with winning him back and would stop at nothing in order to have him. Megan tells Bo that she discovered she was pregnant with his child, after he left town. She tells him that she gave the child up for adoption after her letters and pleas went unanswered, and because her mother convinced her it was the best thing to do in the circumstances. Bo initially softens towards her when he realizes what she must've gone through. However, he begins to doubt her when it's revealed that Roman Brady, his brother, had seen Megan in an abortion clinic.

Throughout 1984, Megan becomes more and more involved with collecting 3 Prisms for her father Stefano DiMera. It's revealed that Stefano is suffering from an inoperable brain tumour and the Prisms are the only way to restore his health. Meanwhile, Bo is keen to help Megan & recover their adopted child, and the search leads them to New Orleans, where it turns out, Megan has conspired to have Diane killed, steal her child, and set up dummy adoptive parents who then allow Megan and Bo to have 'their' child back. Bo saves Diane from the attempted murder and goes along with Megan's deception, in order to stay close to her and get to Stefano.

Andre DiMera shows up in town and kills Max Hathaway. When he calls Megan in to see him, she's initially dismissive, knowing that Stefano always preferred her when they were kids. She was Stefano's Golden Girl, and Andre was always jealous. However, once he reveals that Max is dead it puts a bit of fear into Megan's cocky attitude. Many cat fights occur between Megan and Hope while Megan has Bo close by her side because of 'their child,' Zachary. After the plane crash on the deserted island, which brings Bo and Hope closer than ever to each other, Hope exposes, on a live news report, that her marriage to Larry was a sham, ruining Larry's career and destroying a valuable lackie for the Cartel that Megan was running for Stefano.

In 1985, Megan plots to kill Hope by electrocuting her in a hot tub at Chris' health club, The Body Connection. Megan's plan backfires when she overhears Larry Welch talking to a Russian contact about the 3 prisms Larry's father had invented. When Megan comes out and confronts Larry, they fight. Megan threatens to expose the plot that Larry is entangled with: a plot to blow up all of Salem, killing Stefano in the process. Larry explodes at Megan's tirade and ends up killing her unintentionally. Larry then discovers the electronic drawing and works out the fact they are for rewiring the hot tub to electrocute. Larry, in a panic, picks up Megan's lifeless body and dumps her body in the hot tub, then returns to the closet and, following the diagram, 'electrocutes' her. Megan is then found by Hope, who becomes the prime suspect in her murder.

In Days of Our Lives: Beyond Salem, Megan is revealed to be alive and living in Caracas, Venezuela, in the second season of Beyond Salem. Stefano had her cryogenically frozen until treatment for her injuries could be healed. She spent all her time in Caracas planning to retrieve the prisms once more. With help from Harris Michaels, Thomas Banks, and both John and Steve through brainwashing, Megan retrieved all three which she used to bring Bo Brady back to life and cure his brain tumor.

However, she made him a prisoner when he asked about Hope and had Dr. Rolf brainwash him into wanting nothing to do with Hope. She had him then go to the DiMera mansion to steal the orchid that made Kayla, Marlena and Kate Roberts sick. She believed that Rolf could make a serum from the plant to restore hers and Bo's youth so that she could recapture the spark they had as teenagers and start over. When the three women died, she had their bodies replaced with duplicates and ashes of a goat in Kate's urn. While the three were in cryo-suspension, she had them cured of their sickness, but only to use them as test subjects for Rolf's new serum.

Calliope Jones Bradford

Calliope Jones Bradford was played by Arleen Sorkin from 1984 to 1990, 1992, 2001, 2006, and 2010.

Calliope came to Salem in 1984. She was employed in Liz Curtis's clothing business and her first scenes featured her making a dress for Anna DiMera. One of her trademarks was her endless collections of hats, which were very creative and sometimes very outlandish. However, Calliope soon came to possess a diamond necklace which was originally owned by Daphne DiMera. She claimed it as her own, but didn't realize that Stefano DiMera was after it, for it contained one of three prisms he was after. Her white lie unknowingly thrust her into a major storyline.

Calliope went on to co-host a daytime talk show with Jennifer Horton-Deveraux. The show was a success, but Calliope would eventually turn over the show to Jennifer and leave town. However, since her departure in 1990, Calliope has visited Salem several times.

In 2006, Calliope returned to town as a successful wedding planner. Although hired to plan her good friend Marlena's wedding to Alex North, she was also able to help Shawn-Douglas Brady and Mimi Lockhart with theirs, despite normally being booked two years in advance. Still eccentric, Calliope butted heads with Mimi's mother Bonnie Lockhart, a fellow eccentric, but with a different wild taste. During her trip, Calliope also commented Eugene was doing just fine and she was now living in New York City.

Calliope briefly returned in 2010, when she was hired by Rafe Hernandez to collect evidence to prove that Anna DiMera was hired by EJ to kidnap Sami and EJ's daughter Sydney DiMera.

Shane Donovan

Shane Donovan is an agent of the ISA and husband to Kimberly Brady Donovan.
Donovan and Brady were a supercouple.

In 1984, Shane came to Salem to keep an eye on Stefano DiMera's illegal dealings. He posed as Larry Welche's butler, and eventually learned of Stefano's acquisitions of two of three rare prisms designed by Larry's father. Shane teamed up with Bo, and the two intended on taking Stefano down. Later that year Shane learned that Stefano was about to acquire the third and final prism through a Russian ice skating troupe that came to town. Hope and Bo got the prism from the troupe, but after a long chase with Stefano's men the prism ended up embedded in the ice rink.

Shane returns to Salem briefly in the winter of 2002 when Hope was kidnapped by Larry Welch. Shane later returns in 2010 and was revealed to have been held prisoner in a South American prison while on assignment with the ISA. Shane escaped with the help of Rafe and both returned to Salem in time for Alice Horton's funeral. Shane reconnected with Kimberly, who was in town for Alice's memorial service, and admitted that he wanted his future with her and the family and not with the ISA. Shane and Kimberly reunited and moved to LA to be together as a family.

In July 2013, Jeannie appeared in Salem, having dropped the name and instead uses her middle name, Theresa. She works at the hospital as Jennifer Horton's assistant and later in Human Resources as the assistant to Anne Milbauer. In late 2016, Shane, apparently back in the ISA, returned to warn Theresa that her ex-boyfriend, a Mexican drug cartel boss, was back in town and wanting to reunite with her. The man was apparently so powerful that even Victor Kiriakis is afraid to cross him. Theresa relented and staged her disappearance to return to Mexico with him to protect her friends and family, who the man had threatened. In January 2017, agent Shane was back in town to inform the Salem gang that Stefano DiMera, for whose murder Hope Brady was serving a life sentence, was actually seen alive and well in Prague orchestrating a series of arms deals. Shane's mysterious demeanor during these appearances suggest more to the story than he was letting on. This proved to be true when it was revealed that Shane and brother-in-law Steve Johnson engineered the whole affair, and that Shane himself was impersonating Stefano, to "prove" that Stefano was alive and thereby secure Hope's freedom.

Shane appeared in the first season of Days of Our Lives: Beyond Salem where he tasked John Black to find gemstones belonging to an artifact called the Alamainian Peacock, an item that Hope Brady stole when she was brainwashed by Stefano DiMera to be Princess Gina. During the mission, Shane is knocked unconscious by his brother Drew who impersonates him to retrieve the stones for his plans to destroy Salem and other cities. Ben Weston and Ciara Brady find him and untie him. Before he leaves, Shane makes it clear to Ben he doesn't think of him as innocent due to him killing his granddaughter Paige and other women. After Drew and his partner, Dimitri von Leuschner, are arrested, Shane returns to the ISA.

Ivy Jannings

Ivy Selejko Jannings is a fictional character on the American daytime television soap opera Days of Our Lives.  The character was played by Holly Gagnier from January 17, 1985, until January 9, 1987.

Savannah Wilder 
Savannah Wilder is a fictional character on the NBC daytime soap opera Days of Our Lives, played by Shannon Tweed from April 26, 1985, to December 4, 1986.

Savannah was a crime boss who used a pornography business as a cover for a heroin smuggling operation that was supported by Victor Kiriakis. It was foiled by Bo Brady and Abe's brother Theo.

Savannah became romantically involved with Chris Kositchek, and continued her heroin business. He found out and helped send her to prison. After being released from prison, Savannah attempted to reform to be with Chris, but after discovered she hired a man to attack Marlena so she could look like a hero he dumped her again. Some time later, she left Salem.

In Days of Our Lives: Beyond Salem, she is briefly mentioned. Her and Chris ended up eventually reconnecting, got married, and run a health club.

Theo Carver

Theo Carver, played by Rusty Cundieff, is introduced in 1985 as the younger brother of established character, Abe Carver (James Reynolds). Cundieff first appeared on May 10, 1985. Cundieff vacated the role when Theo was killed off on October 16, 1985.

Theo visits Abe as he is being accused of stealing Savannah Wilder's (Shannon Tweed) purse in 1985. Theo insist that it's just a misunderstanding, even though he and Savannah clearly have history. Theo wants money so he can travel to England to see his friend Bo Brady (Peter Reckell) get married. However, Abe refuses to give him any money until Theo admits what he really needs it for. Theo finds his way to London and breaks Bo and his new wife Hope (Kristian Alfonso) out of jail. On the flight back home, Theo ask for Bo helps to find who was responsible for his best friend's murder, which was connected to record industry. Due to Bo's "rockstar" image, Theo believes he would the perfect cover. Bo isn't interested, as he wants to focus on Hope. However, Theo has already planted story's in the press about Bo's budding music career and the newly weds are mobbed by paparazzi as they return. Theo finally tells Bo that it was there old friend Danny Grant (Roger Aaron Brown) that was murdered. According to Theo, Danny had been hiding something and was carrying a large amount of cash when he was killed. Bo agrees to help, but only if they do it his way, which means they abandon the "rock star" story. Next, they set out to obtain break into Shannon's video studio during the juvenile diabetes benefit concert. However, they get caught and Theo talks his way out of is by convincing Savannah to use Bo in one of her videos. They later stage a fight for Savannah and several executives and Bo insist they use Danny Grant as the technician instead. Savannah claims she doesn't know who Danny is. While she is obviously alarmed, she keeps her cool in front of Bo and Theo.

Robin Jacobs 

Robin Jacobs is a fictional character from NBC's daytime drama, Days of Our Lives. She was portrayed by Derya Ruggles from 1985 to 1987 and, briefly, again in 1989. Robin Jacobs was played by Derya Ruggles.

Robin was a surgeon at University Hospital in Salem. She fell in love with Dr. Mike Horton, but they couldn't be together because she was Jewish. She married Mitch Kaufman, a Jew, but after finding out she was carrying Mike's child, she ended the marriage. In 1987, she left town when she thought Mike would never convert to Judaism. 

In 1989, she returned for a few days to introduce Mike to his son, Jeremy.

Andrew Donovan

Andrew Donovan was portrayed by several child actors including Bradley Pierce, later known for his role in movies such as Jumanji and Beauty and the Beast, until the character left the series in 1992, with further guest appearances in both 1996 and 1997. Andrew is the eldest son of supercouple Shane Donovan and Kimberly Brady (Charles Shaughnessy and, most prominently, Patsy Pease).

When he was born, they believed he was Victor's child because Kimberly had slept with Victor to secure Shane's freedom, and it wasn't until long after the baby was born that they learned the truth. Later, he was kidnapped by Emma Marshall, and adopted by Paul and Barbara Stewart. Andrew was eventually reunited with his real mother.

Now an openly gay adult, Andrew Donovan appeared in the second season of Days of Our Lives: Beyond Salem. He is revealed to be an ISA Agent and was tasked with finding Steve Johnson and John Black after they were kidnapped. John's son Paul assists him and the two begin to connect. After learning Megan Hathaway kidnapped and brainwashed them to do her bidding, Steve is subdued and the two find John and rescue him from Megan's clutches. Once the case is solved, Andrew returns to Washington D.C. and kisses Paul goodbye.

Tamara Price

Tamara Price, portrayed by The 5th Dimension singer Marilyn McCoo, was introduced in August 1986 as the college roommate of Marlena Evans (Deidre Hall).

Tamara surprises Marlena as she is set to remarry Roman Brady (Drake Hogestyn). Tamara initially clashes with Roman's best friend Abe Carver (James Reynolds) as she cut him off in traffic rushing to the ceremony. Tamara is running from Coleman, a mysterious man from her past. Tamara gets a gig singing at Blondie's which upsets Liz Chandler's (Gloria Loring) as she is out of a job. Despite their rocky start, Abe and Tamara begin dating. However, it becomes obvious Tamara is keeping something from him. She is horrified when Coleman confronts her and promises to go "legit" if she returns to him. However, Coleman does not want to leave his wife. Abe looks into Coleman's background when Tamara suddenly announces that they have reunited. She leaves town in May 1987.

McCoo's casting was first announced in the summer of 1986. McCoo revealed to Jet that she would also be singing on the show. A year and a half before debut, McCoo's publicist arranged a meeting with the casting director. "She asked if I'd consider performing in a soap opera I said absolutely." McCoo hoped her role as Tamara would "make people take me more serious as an actress." McCoo said of her experience, "Working on a soap is on-the-job training. It's some of the toughest work you do. Because the demands are greater, I feel if I can cut it on a soap, everything else is easy." However, she admitted that scheduling typically was not a problem because the role was recurring. "Once it got a little crazy, but you deal with it" she said. According to Days the show's publicist Bud Tenarani, Tamara, described as an "entertainer," comes to Salem to "restructure her life and basically to settle down." Tamara initially has an "adversarial relationship" with Abe, they soften toward each other as time passes.

In 2015, Sal Stowers joined the cast as Abe and Tamara's daughter, Lani. It is revealed that Tamara gave to Lani after she left town in 1987 and raised the girl in Miami. Tamara gets married and raises Lani with her husband. In the summer of 2018, Soap Opera Digest reported that Tamara was deceased. However, in 2019 Lani reveals that Tamara is alive and living in Miami.

On October 19, 2019, it was announced that McCoo would reprise beginning November 1, 2019. The series also cast McCoo's real life husband, Billy Davis Jr. in a guest role. Tamara returns to witness Lani's marriage to Eli Grant (Lamon Archey). Head writer Ron Carlivati said of the return: "Anytime we do a wedding, you want it to be as big and festive as possible. Obviously, your mind goes to the family and friends, and given our lovely limitations of daytime, we do what we can. And so one person that we really did want was Tamara Price." While some sources had reported the character's death, Carlivati turned to the writing team to research if Tamara's death had ever been acknowledged onscreen. Once they confirmed Tamara was alive, "We reached out," and despite her busy touring schedule, "it worked out." Not only would Tamara be in attendance, Carlivati revealed that Tamara was set to sing at the wedding. The actress returned again when Lani finally marries Eli in the summer of 2020. In 2021, legendary actress Jackée Harry joined the cast as Tamara's sister, Paulina. On July 22, 2021, Marla Gibbs was cast in the role of Olivia Price, Paulina and Tamara's mother.

Orpheus

Orpheus is the name of a former ISA agent who became a criminal mastermind that rivaled closely to Stefano DiMera and is considered one of the show's most dangerous villains.

In 1979, he and his partner Roman Brady were out on a mission against the KGB when things went wrong. Orpheus's wife, Rebecca, was caught in the crossfires of an ambush. Roman had accidentally shot and killed Rebecca. Orpheus then resigned from the ISA and started planning his revenge on Roman for what he felt was the deliberate, cold-blooded killing by Roman of his wife and leaving his children motherless.

In 1986, he began his revenge on Roman, who in reality was John Black believing himself to be Roman. Orpheus kidnaps Marlena Evans to force "Roman" into following their orders, and held her hostage in order for "Roman" to suffer the way he did when he lost his own wife. Marlena is rescued but not without injury. Later, Orpheus arrives in Salem and kidnapped Kayla Brady and held her hostage until she was saved by Steve Johnson and his associates, and he blew up "Roman's house with Marlena in it to make it look like Marlena was dead, when in fact, Orpheus had kidnapped again and taken her to his secret hideaway in Europe. Orpheus made Marlena play mother to his children and in exchange he promised her that he would not harm "Roman", Carrie or the twins; Eric and Sami. Every move, every step, played out in great detail without any mistake. He foiled "Roman" time and time again. Eventually, "Roman" found the island hideaway, shot and killed Orpheus but was too late to save Marlena who apparently died in a plane crash on the island right in front of his eyes.

Orpheus, revealed to be alive and in prison, resurfaced in 2016 and learned Marlena was alive and that "Roman" was John. Together with Clyde Weston and Xander Cook, Orpheus escaped from prison and wreaked havoc on Salem. First, he showed up at the Kiriakis mansion to announce his return before fleeing. Using the Salem Pier as a base of operations, he and he associates gathered weapons and disguises to continue their revenge against Salem. They went after Steve Johnson's family and held his wife, Kayla, and son, Joey, hostage. Steve and Orpheus got into a scuffle but he managed to escape with Joey. Later, Claire Brady was also taken hostage and Orpheus, on live television, interrupted Mayor Carver's speech to Salem and demanded that twenty million dollars be wired to an offshore account, after which, Clyde accidentally shot Abe Carver instead of his own target Aiden Jennings. The ransom fails and the teens are rescued.

Despite the heavy loss of assets and his accomplices, Orpheus remained confident that he still was still in control, so he arranged to have bombs set up all over Salem. The bombs went off, injuring several people, and when Orpheus threatened to blow up the Brady Pub, John surrendered himself to him. Orpheus took John to the penthouse where John transferred twenty million dollars in his untraceable account. He revealed to John that he blamed him and the rest of Salem and the ISA for alienating him from his children because they made him out to be a monster. Steve rescues John and Orpheus is arrested. Later, he kidnaps Marlena and Kayla and placed them coffins, intending to burn them alive. However Steve and John found his location and arrived just in time to save their wives. During a struggle, Orpheus is shot believed to be dead once again. Unknown to everyone, Orpheus went into hiding after he divulged his secrets to the then ISA boss Pamela Van Damme.

Years later, Orpheus became involved with the death of Adrienne Johnson and miscarriage of Sarah Horton's baby in a car accident after kidnaping Maggie Horton to ransom Victor out of money. He and his son Christian, going by Evan Frears, framed Maggie and Will Horton for the accident. Over the next year he tried to help his son avoid prison time for killing Jordan Ridgeway, the mother of his grandson David. His daughter Zoey Burge was brought to help but Christian is arrested and sentenced to prison and Zoey is granted custody of David before leaving Salem. Orpheus is sent back to prison for his involvement in Adrienne's death.

Even from prison, Orpheus still is able to pull off schemes such as kidnapping Marlena again to release his son from a mental hospital and arranging Christian to take over Ciara's imprisonment to ransom Victor out of money again so he and Christian could leave Salem. However, Clyde intervened and Ciara was rescued and Christian was sent back to prison. Later he learned Jan Spears became pregnant with Christian's child and helped her ensure Shawn Brady believed the baby was his in exchange for her help later on.

Paul Stewart
Paul Stewart was played by Robert S. Woods from November 7, 1986, to May 4, 1987.

Anjelica Deveraux

Anjelica Deveraux was originated by Jane Elliot on March 18, 1987. Elliot was best known for her portrayal of Tracy Quartermaine on General Hospital. Elliot vacated the role on February 15, 1989. Shelley Taylor Morgan briefly played Anjelica for one month from February 21 to March 24, 1989. Judith Chapman later took over on April 7, 1989, until March 19, 1990, when the character was believed to have been killed off in a plane accident with her son Alexander. Chapman returned for two episodes, airing on January 22 and 23, 1991. Anjelica is known for being the second wife of Harper Deveraux, the Riverfront Knifer, and the mistress of Justin Kiriakis (Wally Kurth).

On May 11, 2017, it was announced that veteran actress Morgan Fairchild had been cast to portray Anjelica. Fairchild departed the show on August 29, 2017, when Anjelica suffers a sudden heart attack and dies. Chapman reprised the role as an apparition during the 2018 Halloween episode. In a January 2019 interview, Chapman revealed she had been previously asked to reprise the role of Anjelica prior to Fairchild's casting.

Diana Colville

Diana Colville was portrayed by Genie Francis.

Francis joined Days of Our Lives in the regular role of Diana Colville on April 13, 1987. In June 1989, Francis announced her decision to depart the series. She last appeared during the June 21, 1989, episode. In January 2019, it was announced that Judith Chapman, who previously portrayed the role of Anjelica Deveraux, had been cast in the role of Diana, now going by the surname of Cooper.

Diana came to Salem in 1987 and was Mike Horton's college friend. Diana was competing against both her mother, Serena, and Victor Kiriakis to find a computer disk containing the location of a valuable mineral.

Diana met John Black, who at the time believed himself to be Roman Brady, when she saved Roman's daughter Carrie Brady from drowning in a river. Diana bonded with both Carrie and "Roman," but maintained her pursuit of the disk by feigning a romantic interest in Victor. When Serena obtained the disk, Victor vowed revenge. While in Greece with Victor for his nephew's wedding, Diana made love to "Roman" and they began to pursue a relationship. Serena shot "Roman." He arrested her and found out she was Diana's mother.

After returning to Salem, Diana inherited the Colville fortune when her father was murdered. Victor and Serena plotted to steal the fortune from her. Victor tricked Diana into marrying him to protect Serena, who was supposedly in danger. "Roman" rescued Diana from one planned wedding. At a second ceremony, Serena's kidnapping was staged and Diana was to pay her fortune as ransom. However, Diana's assets were frozen and she was taken hostage by terrorists. Diana was eventually freed and "Roman" revealed Serena and Victor's plot. Diana moved into "Roman's" house for protection. Diana wanted revenge against Victor for losing her inheritance. Diana stole a statue from a museum and planned to frame Victor for it. The plan backfired when "Roman" learned of it. Victor was never charged with the crime, and "Roman" broke up with her over the deception.

Diana and "Roman" resumed their relationship after his investigation of the Torres family put her in danger and she moved back in with him. They hid from the Torreses in the Bahamas and became engaged. Thinking they were safe, they returned to Salem. "Roman" was almost killed by a bomb the Torreses planted. "Roman" began having memory flashes of John's life. When "Roman" also began to suspect that Roman's presumed-dead wife, Marlena Evans was actually alive, it strained his relationship with Diana. Soon after Marlena was found alive, Diana abruptly left Salem, believing her relationship with "Roman" to be unsalvageable.

In 2019, Diana returned to Salem. John, by now a private detective and no longer living as Roman, searched for the mother of Matthew Cooper, who under the alias Leo Stark was blackmailing John's grandson Will Horton. Leo's mother, Diana Cooper, turned out to be Colville, having married a Richard Cooper shortly after leaving Salem. Diana had become an embittered schemer, due in part to Richard's abuse. She kept blackmail material against her own son, who killed Richard. Diana told John that he is Leo's real father; she was pregnant when she left Salem, and Richard agreed to raise her child as his own. Hoping to seduce John, Diana poisoned Marlena with penicillin, to which Marlena is allergic; Marlena survived. Diana was caught and arrested, and she admitted that John is not Leo's father.

Harper Deveraux

Harper Deveraux was played by Joseph Campanella on a recurring status May 8, 1987. On May 10, 1988, Campanella was upgraded to contract status when Harper was revealed to be the Riverfront Knifer, a serial killer who murdered women in Salem including Janice Barnes (Elizabeth Storm) and Grace Forrester (Camilla More). Among his other victims, Eve Donovan (Charlotte Ross), Kayla Brady (Mary Beth Evans), Kimberly Brady (Patsy Pease) and several others managed to survive. Campanella briefly departed the role on July 5, 1988, when he was downgraded back to recurring from August 9, 1988, until October 21, 1988. Campanella later returned as Harper one last time to thwart the second wedding of Steve Johnson and Kayla Brady and later in visions had by his adopted son Jack from March 9, 1990, to April 22, 1992.

Trent Robbins

Trent Robbins was a character on Days of Our Lives played by Charles Van Eman then by Roscoe Born when the character was reintroduced in 2008. He was the biological father of Max Brady and the adoptive father of Melanie Layton.

He abused Max as a child, causing Max to become socially isolated and mute for several years. He showed up at the Brady Pub, wanting to reclaim his son. Trent soon realized Max was happy with the Brady family, and left town.

Trent returned in 2008 as the Dean of the Physics department at Salem University. It was revealed that he was still married to Nicole Walker. He re-entered Max's life by awarding Nick Fallon a grant for his "work" on a fuel cell. Unbeknownst to Trent, Max was responsible for the majority of Nick's design. Max became short-tempered upon seeing Trent and confronted him. After Max insisted that Trent take responsibility for his abusive actions, Trent offered to pay him off in order to keep his past a secret.

Trent was murdered via a stab in the back. Among the suspects were Caroline Brady, Trent's children Max and Melanie, and his wife Nicole. It was revealed that Nick was responsible for the murder. Nick maintained that he killed Trent in Melanie's defense, and that his addiction to alcohol and painkillers played a role in his bad decision.

Henderson
Henderson is Victor's butler. Ron Leath is the actor who plays Henderson off and on since July 6, 1987. He is routinely seen answering the door and serving meals in the Kiriakis mansion. He is extremely loyal to Victor Kiriakis.

Eve Donovan

The character of Eve Donovan was introduced in 1987 and portrayed by actress Charlotte Ross until 1991. In June 2014, the character returned, this time portrayed by actress Kassie DePaiva. In the late 1980s, the character was introduced in the series as a prostitute. Eve is the daughter of Shane Donovan (Charles Shaughnessy) and Gabrielle Pascal. She is also the half-sister of Andrew Donovan IV and Theresa Donovan (Jen Lilley). Upon her return on June 18, 2014, she made an immediate connection with Dr. Daniel Jonas (Shawn Christian) and reunited with her daughter Paige Larson (True O'Brien). DePaiva last appeared as Eve on February 2, 2016. In May 2016, it was announced that DePaiva would briefly reprise her role as Eve, and she aired from September 8 to October 4, 2016. The character returned from December 9 to 12, 2016 following a two-month hiatus. In May 2017, it was revealed the character would yet again return on October 27, 2017, and departed the role again on December 24, 2019 - following her character's release from prison. DePaiva announced in May 2020 that she would returning to the series and she appeared from July 30 to September 25, 2020.

In 2014, after 22 years, Eve returned to Salem and is shown meeting with Dr Daniel Jonas to discuss a throat surgery which she hopes will help relaunch her singing career. She soon reunites with her daughter Paige Larson who she does not know is dating JJ Deveraux, the son of Eve's ex-husband Jack Deveraux and her old high school rival, Jennifer Horton. Eve hopes to gain financial support by obtaining half the profits made by Jack's book about his life in the army, which he apparently owed her as part of their annulment agreement. Jennifer, who is the executive of Jack's estate, refuses to give her any share of the money as it being donated to a charity which supports war veterans, when Eve threatens to sue her, Jennifer can not risk the toll this will have on her family and agrees to give Eve her share.

When Eve learns about JJ's history of drug dealing from her half-sister Theresa, she becomes wary of his and Paige's relationship and does everything she can to split them up. When Eve learns that she will never be able to sing again she is devastated, JJ comes by her apartment hoping to have it out with her after having just broken up with Paige but once he sees how fragile she is he comforts her, they end up having sex and are distraught afterwards when they realize what they have just done to Paige. JJ and Paige soon get back together but are forced to break up when JJ once again sleeps with Eve.

Eve and JJ continue their affair until they are caught in bed together by Jennifer who furiously attacks Eve. Jennifer decides not to tell Paige the truth about JJ and Eve but blackmails Eve into encouraging Paige to get back together with JJ. Eve tries to get JJ arrested by having drugs planted in his backpack, when JJ confronts her about it to get a recorded confession, they do not realize that Paige is in the next room and hears them confessing to their affair. An enraged Paige slaps Eve and disowns her as her mother before going to JJ's house and revealing the truth to all his friends and family who were attending a surprise birthday party JJ was throwing for Paige.

Eve's life is shattered when Paige is murdered by a serial killer known as the Neck-tie killer, who is later revealed to be Ben Weston. This prompts Paige's estranged father and Eve's ex-husband Eduardo Larson to come to Salem in the hope of consoling Eve through her grief, but Eve is still resentful towards him for abandoning her and Paige years previously. She is even more angered to learn that Eduardo is the father of Rafe and Gabi Hernandez, who are part of another family Eduardo left before he met Eve.

Eve begins a relationship with Justin Kiriakis who helped console Eve after Paige's death, when Eduardo wants to set up a music program in Paige's name at the community center, he asks Eve to run it and she accepts. Eve takes a particular interest in Claire Brady, one of her students and believes she possesses great talent as a singer. Eve starts indulging much of her time with Claire much to the annoyance of her mother Belle Brady, who believes Eve is using Claire as a surrogate daughter to replace Paige. When Eve gets Claire an audition for a place at Juilliard School for the performing arts in New York City, she and Claire sneak off to New York without Belle's permission.

Claire returns soon after and reveals that she did not get a place in Juilliard but Eve does not return with her and her Whereabouts remain unknown until her sister Theresa reveals that she is no longer living in Salem when talking about her upcoming wedding to her fiancée Brady Black.

Eve returns several months later for Theresa's bachelorette party and wedding. However, before the wedding starts the party is invaded by former Salem criminal Orpheus who grabs Eve and holds her at gunpoint. She and several other guests are released when Paul Narita takes her place as a hostage. Afterwards at the police station, Eve forms a bond with Nicole Walker over their shared grief of lost loved one's. Eve goes back to New York soon after but not before helping her ex-boyfriend Justin realize he still has feelings for his ex-wife Adrienne.

Marcus Hunter

Marcus Hunter, played by Richard Briggs, was introduced as the childhood friend and foster brother of Steve "Patch" Johnson (Stephen Nichols). Briggs originated the role on November 30, 1987.

In 1987, Marcus is introduced as the new plastic surgeon at Salem University Hospital when he breaks up a fight between his foster brother Steve and Jack Deveraux (Matthew Ashford) – Steve's biological brother. Steve introduces Marcus to Jack's ailing wife, Kayla Brady (Mary Beth Evans) and admits he's in love with her. Marcus gives Steve an antidote for Kayla who has been poisoned.

In early 1988, after Jack has Patch beaten up, Kayla confides in Marcus that Jack raped her, but swears him to secrecy. Jack falls off a roof during a fight with Patch and who donates his kidney to save Jack's life. However, Jack's rejects the kidney and doctors conclude it's psychological, so Marcus encourages Patch and Kayla to reconcile with Jack.

In spring of 1988, Marcus becomes smitten with Police officer Lexie Brooks (Cyndi James Gossett) as she works to apprehend a local serial killer. However, fellow police officer Abe Carver (James Reynolds) also has a thing for Lexie. Marcus accidentally blows Lexie's cover as she investigates a local serial killer. Later, Marcus clashes with social worker Vanessa Walker (Joyce Little) over how to deal with local gangs. Throughout the summer of 1988, Marcus and Vanessa grow closer as they work together at the community center. After they deliver a baby together, Marcus confides in her about growing up in an orphanage with Patch. Marcus recognizes Vanessa's uncle, Desmond (Randy Brooks) but does not know from where. Marcus rescues the daughter of Charlene, (Vanessa Bell Calloway), a woman who frequents the community center. She later takes his advice and gets a job to support herself and her two children. However, Charlene gets fired and Marcus agrees to finance her catering business, as long as she doesn't tell Vanessa. In late 1988, Marcus helps Shane Donovan rescue Patch when he is nearly killed by Stefano DiMera (Joseph Mascolo).

Marcus had always wanted to know about his past, and, in 1989, got help from Gail Carson, an anesthesiologist at the hospital. Marcus, Steve, and Gail went to Charleston, South Carolina to talk to Marcus' aunt, Lizzie Putnam. Lizzie didn't tell them much, and forced him to stop looking into his past. Later, he becomes entangled with Steve's investigation with Saul Taylor's revival camp, briefly dating Saul's daughter Faith. Eventually, Marcus remembered that his parents had been killed by Saul and his partner, Jericho, when they had blown up the church that they were in. Marcus eventually learned Gail was really an ISA agent, and that ended their friendship.

After Steve was believed to have been killed, he developed feelings for Kayla but she did not return those feelings. In 1992, Marcus left Salem. In time, he eventually had two daughters Jada and Talia. It is unknown who their mother is and Marcus has since passed away in between his departure and Jada's arrival in Salem.

Harris Michaels

Harris Michaels was played by Steve Burton in 1988, July 2022 for the second chapter of Beyond Salem, and since March 2023.

Harris went to school with Eve Donovan where he made a bet with his friends to see who could score with her first. After many dates, he began to care about her, but she learned about his true intentions and she attempted to kill herself on sleeping pills. He tried to apologize and make up for it, but Eve never forgave him.

Harris reappeared decades later, formerly of the Navy, now working for Megan Hathaway. He was tasked with dating Hope Brady, so he could later kill her. Harris also kidnapped John Black and Steve Johnson on Megan's orders. Harris proposed to Hope, which made Megan wonder if Harris was falling for Hope. At the wedding, his true allegiance is revealed after he is shot by a stray bullet from Thomas Banks, another associate of Megan's. He still gets the prism to Megan, however, he hesitates to kill Hope which leads to his arrest. Later, Hope visited Harris and asked if he ever really cared about her. Harris claimed he did care about Hope and though maybe he too was brainwashed by Megan just a John and Steve were, but she left him to face the consequences of his actions.

Vern Scofield

Vern Scofield, played by Wayne Heffley from 1988 to 1993 and again in 2002, 2003, and 2006, raised three children (Brian, Tanner, and Cassie) after the death of his wife. Vern's primary role was to be Jack's right-hand man at the Spectator and supported Jack's relationship with Jennifer. Vern began dating Jo Johnson, Jack's mother, in 1999 when both characters left the canvas. In 2002, it was revealed that Vern and Jo had married and were still living in Salem. They returned for Jack's "funeral" in 2003 and later for Jack and Jennifer's wedding and farewell in 2006. Although Heffley died in 2008, Vern was mentioned as alive in December 2016.

Benjy Hawk

Benjy Hawk, is the previously unknown son of Stefano DiMera (Joseph Mascolo). The role was originated by child actor Darrell Thomas Utley from 1988 to 1990. The character was reintroduced in 2006 before he was killed off in 2007.

Kristina Andropolous
Kristina Andropolous was a character portrayed by Chelsea Noble from August to October 1988 and then by Susan Saldivar until November of that year.

Kristina is the sole daughter of Teodor Andropolous. The Andropolous were wealthy neighbors, business partners, and friends of the Kiriakis. Thus, She grew up in the Greek island of Naphleon along with Justin Kiriakis, and she even attended the same Swiss boarding school as he. Kristina and Justin had always been fierce rivals in everything they did, but at the same time kept a very close relationship that turned into a high school romance. After they graduated, they went their separate ways. Kristina eventually became a savvy business woman, as her father prepped her to take over the helm of the Andropolous business.

Alex Kiriakis

Alex Kiriakis is the son of Justin Kiriakis (Wally Kurth) and Anjelica Deveraux (Judith Chapman). The role was originated by child actor Jonathan Thornton from February 24, 1989, until March 19, 1990. Thornton briefly reprised the role from January 23 to February 5, 1991. On July 19, 2022, Soap Opera Digest announced Robert Scott Wilson would take over the role of Alex Kiriakis; he made his debut in the role on July 26.

In February 1989, Anjelica gives birth to her son with her former lover Justin by her side. Anjelica's husband Neil Curtis (Joseph Gallison) misses the birth and Justin steps in, not knowing he is the boy's father. Justin's uncle Victor Kiriakis (John Aniston) names the baby Alexander, after Justin's father, behind Anjelica's back. Anjelica warns him that Neil will fight him in court. Meanwhile, Justin and his estranged wife Adrienne are named the boy's godparents. While Neil is distracted due to his gambling addiction, Victor steals a tape of Anjelica confessing Alexander's paternity and plots to raise Alexander as his own. When Victor and Justin have a falling out, Anjelica convinces Neil to adopt Alexander to keep Victor at bay. Victor suddenly pressures Neil to repay his debts and a desperate Anjelica gives Adrienne a copy of her confession tape. Adrienne confronts Justin and while he admits to the affair, he insist on a DNA test to prove Anjelica's claims. The DNA test proves that Alexander is Justin's son leaving Adrienne devastated and Neil furious over being kept in the dark. Justin promises to provide for Alexander but he refuses to give up on Adrienne. In May 1989, Anjelica takes Alexander and leaves Neil. She tries to rent the apartment next door to Justin, but Adrienne won't allow it. Anjelica later crashes a surprise party for Adrienne's mother Jo (Joy Garrett) begging Justin to take her to the hospital as Alexander is sick. Justin calls Anjelica out for her schemes as Alexander proves to be healthy. When Justin refuses to let her move in with him, she threatens to move in with Victor. Justin calls her bluff and forces Anjelica's hand, so she turns to Victor. Justin legally establishes himself as Alexander's father leaving Adrienne in fear that she'll lose her husband to Alexander and Anjelica. Meanwhile, Anjelica rethinks her decision to raise Alexander around Victor due to his womanizing. Victor offers to marry Anjelica but she rejects him for Justin. Fearing Victor will ultimately turn Alexander against him, Justin schemes to get Alexander, and Anjelica, away from his uncle. A desperate Anjelica accepts Victor's proposal only for Justin to interrupt the wedding and announce that Alexander and Anjelica are moving in with him. Unable to cope with Anjelica and Alexander's presence, Adrienne moves out leaving Justin in turmoil as he cannot choose between his wife and his son. After failing to seduce Justin, Anjelica plans to take Alexander and move out only for Victor to have him abducted from Justin's penthouse. Fortunately, Roman Brady (Drake Hogestyn) rescues Alexander from Victor's henchwoman, Yvette (Lori Hallier). Anjelica starts to spiral as she prepares to move out and Justin ask her and Alexander to stay. In October 1989, Justin moves back to the Kiriakis mansion alongside Alexander and Anjelica just as he and Adrienne are legally separated. In November 1989, Anjelica is worried that Alexander will lose out on his piece of the Kiriakis empire when Victor announces his engagement to Yvette.

When Anjelica's plans to ruin Adrienne's construction business are uncovered, she destroys evidence of her planting a bomb at one of the sights and plans to skip town with Alexander in March 1990. Anjelica and Alexander are believed to have died when their plane reportedly crashes leaving Justin devastated and Victor blaming his nephew. However, Anjelica and Alexander are alive as they were on another flight.

In early 1991, Johnny Corelli (Antony Alda) steals $1 million from Victor to buy information on Alexander and Anjelica. However, he learns mother and son are alive, and tracks them to a private island. Knowing her son needs a better life, Anjelica lets Johnny take Alexander back to Salem. Before he is arrested, Johnny hands the boy over his former sister-in-law April Ramirez (Lisa Howard). Posing as Victor's son Bo Brady (Peter Reckell), Johnny lures Justin back to Salem from Texas by claiming Victor is sick again. Johnny successfully reunites Alexander with Justin. Justin and Adrienne take Alexander to their home in Dallas.

Soon after they arrived in Texas, Adrienne gave birth to his younger half-brother, Jackson "Sonny" Kiriakis (Freddie Smith). Although never shown on-screen, Alexander returned to Salem in 2007 with his parents and brothers, where he attended Salem High School. His time in town was short lived, however, and by January 2008 the entire family moved again – this time to Dubai. In 2011, Sonny revealed that Alexander had a difficult time at first accepting when he first came out as gay. In 2015, Alexander was revealed to be living in Arizona when Sonny was going through troubles with his husband Will Horton (Chandler Massey) and he went to visit him.

In late July 2022, Alex returns to Salem, where he reunits with his father and his brother Sonny, also meeting his stepmother Bonnie Lockhart (Judi Evans). After he broke up with Sloan Peterson (Jessica Michel), after he found out that she is Leo Stark's (Greg Rikaart) lawyer, while he was on his way to work, he bumped into Stephanie Johnson (Abigail Klein), the daughter of Steve Johnson (Stephen Nichols) and Kayla Brady (Mary Beth Evans), who just arrived back in town and after listening his brother Sonny's words on love, he developed a connection to Stephanie.

Ernesto Toscano

Ernesto Toscano was a character from Days of Our Lives portrayed by Terrance Beasor from November to December of 1989, Charles Cioffi and Ernesto Macias from January 26 to July 13 of 1990.

He was introduced as a voice-over in flashback in Isabella's mind before being introduced formally in 1990 as Victor Kiriakis' former friend turned enemy. After he found out his wife Loretta had an affair with Victor, which resulted in Isabella, he poisoned her. He kidnapped Bo Brady and Johnny Corelli as part of a plan to destroy Victor, however, the two men escaped and Ernesto lost his leverage. He later learned that Isabella had killed his only biological daughter Marina, albeit in self-defense, which only incensed his hatred for her even more.

He arranged the Cruise of Deception, during which he planned to recover Loretta's diary, and get revenge on all his enemies. He invited Roman Brady (John Black), Victor Kiriakis, Jack Deveraux, Jennifer Horton, Bo, Hope Williams Brady, Julie Olson Williams, and Isabella to come along. He had set a bomb to explode on board the cruise ship while taking Isabella to an island to kill her the same way he killed Loretta. Everyone on board, however, escaped to the island and save Isabella. But Ernesto still had the upper hand. He held Hope suspended over a vat of acid. Ernesto gave Bo a chance to plead for his wife's life, but he wasn't moved by what Bo had to say. Suddenly there was an explosion, and the cage was sent crashing down into the vat of acid and Ernesto has been presumed dead since. It was learned years later that another young woman, Greta Von Amberg, took Hope's place and ended up horribly scarred while Hope had ended up with Stefano DiMera, believing she was Princess Gina Von Amberg.

See also
 Days of Our Lives characters
 Days of Our Lives characters (1960s)
 Days of Our Lives characters (1970s)
 Days of Our Lives characters (1990s)
 Days of Our Lives characters (2000s)
 Days of Our Lives characters (2010s)
 Days of Our Lives cast members
 List of previous Days of Our Lives cast members

Notes and references

1980s